Keegan Kolesar (born April 8, 1997) is a Canadian professional ice hockey right winger for the  Vegas Golden Knights of the National Hockey League (NHL).

Early life
Kolesar was born on April 8, 1997, in Brandon, Manitoba to former linebacker K. D. Williams and Corrinne. The parents divorced following his birth and Corrinne remarried to Charles Peterson who played for the Kansas City T-Bones of the Northern League. During the 2019–20 NHL season, Peterson contracted COVID-19.  When Peterson’s death became imminent in mid-September 2020, Kolesar left his team’s bubble to say goodbye to his step-father.

Playing career
Kolesar was drafted 69th overall in the 2015 NHL Entry Draft by the Columbus Blue Jackets. On June 24, 2017, Kolesar was traded to the Vegas Golden Knights in exchange for the Vegas' second-round draft pick in the 2017 NHL Entry Draft. He was called up to the Golden Knights on January 10, 2020 and made his NHL debut the following night against the Blue Jackets.

On March 22, 2021, Kolesar scored his first career goal in the third period for the Golden Knights against the St. Louis Blues.

Career statistics

Regular season and playoffs

International

References

External links
 

1997 births
Canadian ice hockey right wingers
Chicago Wolves players
Columbus Blue Jackets draft picks
Living people
Ice hockey people from Manitoba
Quad City Mallards (ECHL) players
Seattle Thunderbirds players
Sportspeople from Brandon, Manitoba
Vegas Golden Knights players
Black Canadian ice hockey players